Bhauwapar is a village in the Gorakhpur district, Uttar Pradesh in India, near the border with Nepal. The ancient Mungeshwar nath temple is the heritage of Bhauwapar.

References

Villages in Gorakhpur district